Ada Madssen (9 February 1917 – 22 September 2009) was a Norwegian sculptor.

She was born in Kristiania. She studied under Wilhelm Rasmussen and Axel Revold at the Norwegian National Academy of Fine Arts from 1938 to 1940. The National Museum of Art, Architecture and Design owns three of her works, and she is also known for statues of Queen Maud near the Royal Palace, Oslo (erected 1959) and Camilla Collett at Eidsvoll (erected 1977). In 2007 she was decorated as a Knight First Class of the Royal Norwegian Order of St. Olav.

References

1930 births
2009 deaths
Norwegian women sculptors
Artists from Oslo
Oslo National Academy of the Arts alumni
20th-century Norwegian sculptors
Order of Saint Olav